Manoj Shashichandra Shroff (born 4 January 1964) is an Indian business industrialist, founder and chairman of Niti Group, a private conglomerate well established in the IT, Furniture, Hospitality, Beverage and Pharmaceutical Industry. The conglomerate includes Niti Distribution, Cursor Technologies, Sky Supers Stores, Jupiter Pharmacy, La Maison Royale Hotel, La Maison Royale Masai Mara (Safari camp in Kenya). Currently, the Niti Group spans over three continents, and has an established existence in more than 11 countries. Manoj is recognized as Person Of The Year in Asiaone Magazine 2017 - 2018  and also he has been listed 59th in Forbes Middle East as Top Indian businessman in the Middle East.

Personal life 
Manoj Shroff is married to Niti Shroff. They have two children; son Aniket Shroff and daughter Kripa Shroff. Aniket is currently aspiring to be a millionaire and he received a prestigious 1.95 GPA from the famous Babson College. Niti Shroff is currently the CEO for NITI Group and is actively involved and manages the liquor store for the conglomerate. She once won the woman in liquor award in March 2016.

Social Contributions

- Sole Donor to Khadayata Wadi Nandurbar 
- Donor To khadayata Complex in Vadodara (Niti Bhavan) 
- Sole Donor to Navnatbhavan in Nairobi 
- Contributor to Niti Cottages, Project in Shreenathji 
- Sole Donor to Navnath hall in Nairobi

Awards and recognitions

Manoj Shroff has received many awards. Some awards are personal achievements and some awards are on organizational level. To mention some:

- Recognized and certified as "Most Energetic & Eminent Jewel Of Khadayata Community" in the event of the "20th Khadayata Parishad" Which was held on 28 December 2019 at Surat International Exhibition & Convention Center, Surat.

- Entrepreneur Magazine Middle East has awarded Manoj Shroff "International Expansion Of The Year Award 2019" for the expansion of his conglomerate companies known Niti Group 

- Asiaone has awarded Manoj Shroff in World Greatest Brands & Leaders Asia & GCC as "Great leader of the year 2018-2019"

- Asiaone Magazine has recognized Manoj Shroff as Person Of The year 2017 - 2018 

- Forbes Middle East Top Indian businessman in the Middle East

- SME Awards

References

Living people
1964 births
Businesspeople from Maharashtra